José Augusto may refer to:
José Augusto (footballer) (born 1937), Portuguese footballer
José Augusto (musician) (born 1953), Brazilian musician
José Augusto, a RENAMO leader and negotiator at the Rome General Peace Accords